Barttelot is a surname. Notable people with the surname include:

 Barttelot baronets
 Walter Barttelot (1820–1893), British politician
 David Barttelot (1821–1852), English cricketer
 Brian Barttelot (1867–1942), British Royal Navy officer